The 1957–58 Scottish Cup was the 73rd staging of Scotland's most prestigious football knockout competition. The Cup was won by Clyde who defeated Hibernian in the final.

First round

Replays

Second round

Replays

Third round

Replays

Quarter-finals

Semi-finals

Replays

Final

Teams

See also
1957–58 in Scottish football
1957–58 Scottish League Cup

References

External links
 Video highlights from official Pathé News archive

Scottish Cup seasons
1957–58 in Scottish football
Scot